Tașaul may refer to:

 Lake Tașaul, a lake in Northern Dobruja, Romania
 Tașaul River, a river in Romania